Don't Torture a Duckling is a 1972 Italian giallo film directed by Lucio Fulci, starring Florinda Bolkan, Tomas Milian and Barbara Bouchet. The plot follows a detective investigating a series of child murders in an insular village in Southern Italy whose residents are riddled with superstition and mistrust. The film's score was composed by Riz Ortolani and features vocals by Ornella Vanoni.

Released in the Autumn of 1972 in Italy, Don't Torture a Duckling is significant within Fulci's filmography as it is one of the first in which he began using violent gore effects, something he would continue to do in his later films, including Zombi 2, The Beyond and City of the Living Dead. The film has been noted by critics for its commentary on sexuality in the Catholic Church.

The "duckling" in the film's title refers to a Donald Duck doll that has its head removed by a girl with an intellectual disability, which provides a clue to the murders.

Plot 
In the small Southern Italian village of Accendura, three boys, Bruno, Michele, and Tonino, engage in mischief and other activities. Giuseppe Barra, a local simpleton spying on two locals engaged with visiting prostitutes, is surprised when the three boys who are watching him begin to taunt him. Meanwhile, in the hills surrounding the village, La Magiara, a reclusive Gypsy witch, conducts black magic ceremonies, first by digging up the skeletal remains of an infant and then plunging pins through the heads of three tiny clay dolls. It is made clear that these are the three youths taunting Giuseppe.

When Bruno goes missing, a media circus begins as reporters from all over Italy converge on the town. One of them is Andrea Martelli, a sharp-witted journalist from Rome whose insights into the case are acknowledged by the regional police commissioner working with the collaboration of the village chief of police Captain Modesti. Amid local hysteria, Giuseppe is arrested when he picks up a ransom he demanded from the boy's parents for the boy's return. While he takes police to the buried body of Bruno, he protests his innocence of murder, for he claims to have only discovered the body of the boy and then phoned the parents in a feeble attempt to extract a surprisingly small ransom. When the corpse of Tonino is found, the police realize that Giuseppe is innocent. A few nights later, during a raging thunderstorm, Michele sneaks out of his house to meet with someone he speaks to over the phone, and he too is strangled by an unseen assailant, and his body is found the following morning.

Martelli soon meets and befriends Patrizia, whom he recognizes from newspapers where he used to work in Milan. Patrizia is living at her father's house in the town as she is lying low after a drug scandal. The rest of the insular villagers ostracize her because of her big-city ways, perceived lack of morality, and modern dress style with halter-tops and mini-skirts. She has various seemingly sinister interactions with several children from the town, including Michele, with whom she seductively teases, then rejects, while nude; Mario, a young boy whom she offers the choice of either payment or a kiss in exchange for fixing a flat tire; and Malvina, priest Don Alberto’s disabled sister, who is dragged by Patrizia across the town square against her will, in order that Patrizia could buy Malvina a doll.

Martelli also meets with the amiable young village priest, Don Alberto Avallone, and his reserved mother, Aurelia. Don Alberto runs a boys' group at the church, which the murder victims belonged to, and encourages the boys to play soccer on the church grounds to keep them out of trouble. As the local priest, he is well-known and respected in the area.

Meanwhile, Captain Modesti and his aide visit Francesco, an eccentric old hermit living in a tumbledown stone hut in the hills overlooking the town, who practices black magic, offering charms and potions to the superstitious. He claims he has passed his magical knowledge to his daughter, Magiara, and also spends time with the casual thrill-seeking Patrizia. He is also rumored to have had (and then disposed of) a baby from a tryst with Magiara. Angered by Francesco's unwillingness to co-operate with the investigation, the police proceed to hunt down and arrest Magiara. Under interrogation, the fevered woman gleefully confesses to the murders. However, it appears to Modesti and the Commissioner that she believes her voodoo dolls and incantations have alone brought about the deaths of the three interfering boys, and she professes to have no interest in or awareness of the physical methods used. An alibi provided by a policeman sighting Magiara miles away from the latest murder scene clinches her innocence, and she is released.

Nonetheless, the hostile and superstitious villagers are not convinced: Magiara is shunned by the local women and then attacked in a local graveyard by a small group of men who savagely beat her with heavy chains and then leave her for dead. She manages to crawl to the highway but dies. The following day, another young boy is found drowned in a local stream, which further increases police frustration about the case.

During further meetings with Don Alberto, Martelli learns that Don Alberto's mother has a young child, a six-year-old deaf and mute girl with an intellectual disability. Martelli becomes convinced that the little girl is a witness to the killings after seeing that she compulsively pulls the heads off her dolls as if imitating the strangulations. One doll's head, that of Donald Duck, is found near the latest crime scene. When Aurelia disappears with her daughter, Martelli and Patrizia track her down hiding out at a remote shack on a hill overlooking the town. When they arrive, Aurelia is found barely conscious, begging them to help her stop her crazy son. It turns out that Don Alberto strangled those young boys, not for their sins but to prevent them from sinning when they grow up. In his twisted mind, Don Alberto believes that as a man of God, he has the right to kill young boys to send them to Heaven with clean souls.

Don Alberto now attempts to throw his little sister, a witness to the crimes, off a remote cliff. Martelli arrives in the nick of time, and after a climactic fistfight between Martelli and Don Alberto, the insane priest loses his balance and falls off the cliff to his gruesome death.

Cast 
 Florinda Bolkan as La Maciara
 Barbara Bouchet as Patrizia
 Tomas Milian as Andrea Martelli
 Irene Papas as Aurelia Avallone
 Marc Porel as Don Alberto Avallone
 Georges Wilson as "Uncle" Francesco
 Antonello Campodifiori as Police Lieutenant
 Ugo D'Alessio as Captain Modesti
 Virgilio Gazzolo as Police Commissioner
 Vito Passeri as Giuseppe Barra
 Rosalia Maggio as Mrs. Spriano, Michele's mother
 Andrea Aureli as Mr. Lo Cascio, Bruno's father
 Linda Sini as Mrs. Lo Cascio, Bruno's mother
 Franco Balducci as Mr. Spriano, Michele's father
 Fausta Avelli as Malvina Avallone (uncredited)

Release 
Don't Torture a Duckling was released theatrically in Italy on September 29, 1972.

When the film was first released in 1972, it received only a limited release in Europe, due to the film's themes, among which was criticism of the Roman Catholic Church. It was released in France as La longue nuit de l'exorcisme/ The Long Night of Exorcism. Though an English language audio track was created for the movie in 1972, it was never theatrically released in the United States and remained unreleased until 1999 when Anchor Bay Entertainment released the film on DVD and VHS. Adrian Luther Smith's reference work lists the translation of the original Italian title as Don't Torture Donald Duck, since in Italy, the cartoon character is referred to as Paperino.

Home media 
The film was made available for the first time ever in the United States on both VHS and DVD through Anchor Bay Entertainment as part of the "Lucio Fulci Collection", uncut and remastered, containing its original aspect ratio of 2.35:1 for the DVD release. American distribution company Blue Underground released the same version of the film on DVD on 27 February 2007.

In the United Kingdom, Shameless Screen Entertainment made the film available on DVD on 29 August 2011 in a "Shameless Fan Edition", which contains, for the first time, optional English and Italian audio and subtitles, the Italian theatrical trailer and a booklet adapted by Stephen Thrower from Beyond Terror, his definitive book.

Reception  
Bloody Disgusting awarded the film a positive score of  out of 5. Praising the film's cinematography, music, and gory special effects, calling it one of their all-time favorite film by director Fulci.
AllMovie gave the film a positive review calling the film "one of Fulci's more successful outings".
TV Guide awarded the film 3 out of 5 stars. Complimenting the film's direction, atmosphere, and well executed murder scenes, stating "Lucio Fulci's murder mystery paints an exceptionally unflattering portrait of small-town Sicily as a backwater rife with perversion, ignorance, madness and murderous small-mindedness".
 
According to Danny Shipka, the small Italian town of the setting turns out to be an Italian version of Harper Valley PTA, with suspects including voyeurs, drug addicted pedophiles, gypsies and priests. He finds that the film provides a thought-provoking depiction of life and politics in a small town of Italy. The main themes are "repression, sin and guilt". The motive of the murder turns out to be a desire to rescue the boys from the effects of their own sexuality. In other words, the killer attempts to preserve the innocence of the victims. He is attempting to send them to Heaven while they remained in a stage of uncorrupted grace.

Shipka finds that the film also demonstrates the tendency of giallo filmmakers to seriously question religion and priesthood. Mikel J. Koven points that predatory priests also appeared in Who Saw Her Die? (1972) and The Bloodstained Shadow (1978).

Troy Howarth, author of So Deadly, So Perverse: 50 Years of Italian Giallo Films, calls it one of the most beautifully photographed Italian genre films in his commentary track for Arrow Video's 2017 Blu-ray release of the film.

References

Works cited

External links 
 
 
 

1972 films
1972 horror films
1970s mystery thriller films
1970s horror thriller films
Films directed by Lucio Fulci
Films set in Italy
Films shot in Matera
Giallo films
Italian horror films
1970s Italian-language films
Italian mystery thriller films
Italian serial killer films
Religious horror films
Films about sexual repression
Films critical of the Catholic Church
Films scored by Riz Ortolani
1970s exploitation films
Italian splatter films
1970s Italian films